David Paul Hammer (October 9, 1958 – June 7, 2019) was an American federal prisoner serving life without possibility of parole.  He was sentenced to death on November 4, 1998 for the murder of his cell mate, Andrew Marti. He was also a writer and anti-death penalty advocate who achieved media fame for his 2004 autobiography The Final Escape, Secrets Worth Dying For (his 2004 first book about Timothy McVeigh), and 2010's Deadly Secrets: Timothy McVeigh and the Oklahoma City Bombing, based on information from when McVeigh was a then-fellow death row inmate.  Hammer was also known for his appeals against his 1998 federal death sentence and against the death penalty itself. Hammer's federal conviction was vacated in 2005 for the government's Brady violation (failure to disclose exculpatory or mitigating information it had).   After 16 years in isolation on federal death row isolation at Terre Haute prison in Indiana, in 2014 the court resentenced him to life without parole. He was serving his sentence at the ADX Florence, Colorado until his death at Terre Haute in 2019.

Early years 
David Hammer, the oldest of three children, grew up in an abusive and impoverished family.   Often, the Hammer family of five lived out of their car.  David would sleep in the trunk while the younger two children slept in the passenger compartment.   They would fish in nearby creeks for food.  At age 7, Hammer worked alongside his parents laying irrigation pipes, and by 9 he was working with them in the fields.  Hammer attended 21 different schools in 10 years before dropping out of high school in his sophomore year.  There was no stability in his childhood.  Hammer had no chance to make meaningful friendships.

The neglect and poverty in which Hammer lived was shadowed by repeated sexual assaults and physical and emotional abuse inflicted by both of his parents.  What Hammer experienced was tantamount to torture.  The abuse began at the age of 5.  The horrors included, after being sexually assaulted, Hammer's mother giving him ‘enemas’ of near boiling water and hot sauce to “burn the evil out of him.”

At age 7, a great uncle had given the Hammer children each their own puppy.  A week later, Hammer's mother blamed David for his brother's puppy being hit by a car.  To ‘teach him a lesson,’ she made Hammer scoop up the corpse and put it in a gunny sack.  She then hit Hammer, screaming incoherently, then commanded him to fill a second gunny sack with rocks.  To his horror, she put the two remaining puppies into the sack and hit them repeatedly with the shovel.  When Hammer tried to stop her, she slapped and kicked him.  Afterwards, she made him carry the sack with her to a nearby pond and they threw it in the water.  Smiling, she told him to never tell anyone.  Over the years, the sexual and mental abuse, the ‘enemas,’ and the beatings continued.  Hammer was beaten with extension cords, hair brushes (the bristle side), ash trays, open hands and closed fists.

At 13, Hammer found the courage to run away.  He was gone for several weeks before returning.  He tried to start his own business by selling baby chicks at Eastertime.  At age 15, desperate to escape his home life and abusers, Hammer quit school and left the house for good.  He lived on the streets, worked low-paying jobs and began taking drugs, “hustling and searching for love and acceptance.”  Hammer learned to advocate for himself and became an avid reader, spending borrowed money to buy books.  At 16, Hammer thought he found love and got married, though subsequently divorced.  By 18, he had opened a game room and was able to sell the business for $15,000.

At age 14, realizing he needed help, some type of emotional support and mental health counseling, Hammer, on his own, sought treatment.  When the psychologist contacted his parents, they refused to participate or support his treatment.  He continued with treatment on his own, including both inpatient and outpatient and for drug use in Oklahoma hospitals, until he was 19.

Criminal history 
Despite moments of small success, Hammer continued to use drugs to cope with his past.  At age 19, in January 1978, while high on PCP, Hammer realized he needed help and, hoped to obtain treatment, went to the emergency room at Baptist Hospital where he had been previously hospitalized in their mental health unit.  His bizarre behavior attracted the attention of a hospital security guard.  Hammer brandished a pistol, believing it was unloaded, shouting, “I need help!”  In his drug-induced state, Hammer took 3 people hostage.  After hours of failed negotiations, a SWAT team finally caught him and took him in.

Since the age of 19, most of Hammer's time in prison was spent in special housing or solitary confinement, for a multitude of offenses: larceny, escape, the hostage takings, and telephoning in a bomb threat.  After two escapes, Oklahoma County prosecutors charged him with kidnapping, robbery using a firearm, and shooting with intent to kill.  Convicted, the judge sentenced Hammer to 400 consecutive years on each count.   In all, Hammer was serving 1232 years for multiple Oklahoma convictions. An Oklahoma post-conviction application challenging the truth of the shooting/kidnap victim's testimony identifying Hammer was granted in part after the judge found the victim's trial testimony was false and not credible. The Oklahoma judge ordered a sentence modification hearing for Hammer. 

Once known as a conman and prankster, Hammer ordered a dozen roses be delivered to the Oklahoma State Penitentiary Warden using the warden's assistant's credit card. He then alerted local media to the prank.  In December 1993, Oklahoma and Bureau of Prisons (BOP) agreed to place Hammer into Federal BOP custody where he serve out his Oklahoma sentence.  Hammer has BOP ID# 24507-077.

Death sentence 
In September 1996, the United States Attorney for the Middle District of Pennsylvania charged Hammer with the April 1996 death of his cellmate, 27-year-old Andrew Hunt Marti (BOP # 58008-065).  Hammer and Marti were both housed in the Special Housing Unit at the U.S. Penitentiary – Allenwood.  The government alleged Hammer strangled Marti using a piece of cell-made cord while both men were housed in the Special Housing Unit at U.S.P.-Allenwood.

In June 1998, midway through his jury trial, Hammer plead guilty. On November 4, 1998, the Federal District Judge in the Middle District of Pennsylvania sentenced Hammer to death. On January 14, 1999 at 10:00 A.M., Hammer was scheduled to die by lethal injection.   

Initially, Hammer resigned himself to his fate, finding no motivation to fight his conviction.  He had no plans to fight his death sentence.  Later he acquiesced and allowed an appeal to be filed.  However, once a Notice of Appeal was filed, he vacillated on his decision to appeal.   After arguing to dismiss his own appeal before the Third Circuit, the appeals court agreed. 

During the next few years, Hammer had multiple execution dates set for January 14, 1999, November 16, 2000, February 2001, and June 8, 2004.  Weeks before his first execution date, Hammer contacted Sister Camille D’Arienzo, a Sister of Mercy, asking for prayers for him and his victim. Sister Camille traveled from New York to USP-Allenwood with a laicized priest to visit Hammer just 2 weeks from his scheduled execution.   Sister Camille became Hammer's spiritual advisor.  Once BOP transferred Hammer to USP-Terre Haute, Sister Camille arranged for Sister Rita Clare Gerardot, a Sister of Providence from St. Mary's of the Woods, to visit him on a regular basis. With the support, encouragement and counseling of Sisters Camille and Rita Clare, Hammer found new meaning and devoted his time in prison to help others.  Before the Christmas holidays, he created artwork which the Sisters used to create and print holiday cards for sale. The Sisters ensured, at Hammer's request, that the money raised was donated to organizations that helped abused or at-risk youth, and poor and needy children in Haiti and Jamaica.  Over several years, Hammer helped to raise $92,000 to help impoverished children like Hammer. Sisters Camille and Rita Clare remained his spiritual advisors and friends.

On October 25, 2000, a Pennsylvania U.S. District Judge postponed Hammer's second execution date scheduled for November 16, 2000 to allow Hammer time to appeal.  Had the execution gone forward, Hammer would have been the first prisoner executed by the federal government in 37 years. 

Hammer credits the nine-year-old daughter of Juan Raul Garza, Brownsville drug boss and fellow death row inmate (executed in 2001), for his motivation to fight his conviction.  The daughter, Elizabeth Ann Garza, reportedly told Hammer that ‘his life could make a difference for others.’   Elizabeth Ann's letter to President Bill Clinton appealing against her own father's sentence was also reported to have motivated Hammer to appeal his own death sentence.  Hammer himself wrote to President Clinton, asking him to commute for Garza's sentence to life imprisonment, describing the death penalty as ‘plagued by systemic bias, disparity and arbitrariness.’   Clinton Era documents released in 2014 showed “former President Jimmy Carter and his wife, Rosalynn, weighed in on behalf of Juan Raul Garza and David Paul Hammer, arguing that Mr. Clinton should spare them because of problems with the application of capital punishment in America.” 

While housed at the ADX-Florence (CO), Hammer and Timothy McVeigh first became acquainted.  They were in the first group of death-sentenced inmates to be housed in the newly refurbished death row at USP-Terre Haute, eventually living in adjacent cells. 

In 2004, during Hammer's time on death row at USP-Terre Haute, he published his autobiography, The Final Escape.  He wrote two books on the Oklahoma City bombing based on knowledge gleaned first-hand from Timothy McVeigh before McVeigh's execution: Secrets Worth Dying For: Timothy James McVeigh and the Oklahoma City Bombing (2004), co-authored with Jeffery William Paul.

Later in 2010, Hammer published Deadly Secrets: Timothy McVeigh and the Oklahoma City Bombing.  In May 2010, shortly following Deadly Secrets’ publication, Hammer appeared on Alex Jones’ talk show for an extended interview, detailing his relationship with McVeigh and McVeigh's account of the US government's alleged involvement in the bombing. 

On February 11, 2004, Hammer's third execution date was set for June 8, 2004.  The Appellate Court stayed Hammer's execution only 4 days before June 8th to allow for review of his case.   On December 27, 2005, the district court vacated Hammer's death sentence and set aside his conviction based upon the government hiding favorable evidence that supported Hammer's defenses. 

Back in court, on July 17, 2014, U.S. District Judge Joel Slomsky resentenced Hammer to life imprisonment without possibility of parole. Judge Slomsky found multiple circumstances warranting a sentence less than death, including Hammer's acceptance of responsibility and remorsefulness, his extended family history of dysfunction, abuse and mental illness, his mental and emotional impairments, and his self-improvement.  Judge Slomsky also identified Hammer's medical diagnoses - “diabetes mellitus, type II [high blood sugar requiring insulin dependency], diabetic polyneuropathy [the gradual destruction of nerve sensations, especially in the extremities], diabetic retinopathy [scarring of the retina], and/or diabetic macular edema [release of retinal blood into the vitreous fluid in the eye, blocking vision to the point of legal blindness]” - and Hammer's charitable contributions during his 9 years on death row and his correspondence with at-risk children counseling them against engaging in criminal conduct.

Life in prison 
At the time of his resentencing, Hammer had long been classified as a BOP Medical Care Level 3 inmate. In early 2015, after 18 years in solitary confinement, BOP transferred Hammer directly to USP-Tucson, one of the few BOP prisons able to accept Care Level 3 inmates. Within a few months, they hospitalized Hammer for a partial amputation of his right foot for osteomyelitis, a bone infection. The amputation did not cure his condition, and BOP reclassified him to a Care Level 4. In early 2016, BOP transferred Hammer to MCFP-Springfield, a medical prison. In 2017, a further right foot amputation removed the ulcerated area. He also suffered a minor stroke in August 2017. Hammer's blindness became almost total. In March 2018, BOP moved Hammer to ADX Florence, Colorado after he strangled an inmate. This is an administrative maximum or "super max" federal prison in Florence, Colorado, also known as the "Alcatraz of the Rockies."

Except for two brief escapes during the 1980s, Hammer was continuously incarcerated for over 40 years. Hammer served 30 of those years in solitary confinement isolation, and 16 years on death row.

References

1958 births
2019 deaths
People from Hughes County, Oklahoma
American people convicted of murder
American prisoners sentenced to death
Prisoners sentenced to death by the United States federal government
People convicted of murder by the United States federal government
Inmates of ADX Florence